The Three Kingdoms period (220–280) was the tripartite division of China among the states of Wei, Shu, and Wu.

Three Kingdoms may also refer to:

History and geography
 Three Kingdoms of Korea, (57 BC – 668), a period in Korean history
 Later Three Kingdoms of Korea: Silla, Later Baekje, and Taebong from 892 to 936
 Kingdom of Georgia, which broke into three independent kingdoms, Kingdom of Kartli, Kingdom of Kakheti, and Kingdom of Imereti in 1490
 Era of Three Kings, an era in the history of Estonia from 1561 to 1625/1629 when Estonia was divided between Sweden, Poland–Lithuania and Denmark
 Three Kingdoms, from the Union of the Crowns (1603) to the Acts of Union (1800), of England, Scotland, and Ireland, encompassing the Wars of the Three Kingdoms from 1639 to 1651
 the Kalmar Union uniting the "Three Crowns" of medieval Scandinavia
 Three Kingdoms of Lan Xang: Kingdom of Luang Prabang, Kingdom of Vientiane and Kingdom of Champasak
 After the reign of Cotys I, the Odrysian Kingdom collapsed into three different dynasties until its conquest by Philip II of Macedon

Biology
 Three-domain system, initially called three "kingdoms", a classification of cellular life forms

Media
 Records of the Three Kingdoms, 3rd century historical text by Chen Shou
 Romance of the Three Kingdoms, 14th century historical novel by Luo Guanzhong
 Three Kingdoms (manhua), series of graphic novels by Hong Kong artist Lee Chi Ching, published in the 1990s
 Romance of the Three Kingdoms (TV series), 1994 Chinese TV series
 Three Kingdoms (TV series), 2010 Chinese TV series
 Three Kingdoms: Resurrection of the Dragon, 2008 Hong Kong film
 Zimiamvia, the Kingdoms of Fingiswold, Meszria and Rerek in the Zimiamvian Trilogy by E. R. Eddison

Games
 Legends of the Three Kingdoms, a Chinese card game
 Portal Three Kingdoms, starter level set of the card game Magic: The Gathering
 Romance of the Three Kingdoms (video game series), by Koei, based on the Chinese legend
 3Kingdoms, a MUD, or text-based online role-playing game
 Three Kingdoms: Fate of the Dragon, a PC strategy game
 Three Kingdoms Online, a MMO SLG strategy browser game
 Total War: Three Kingdoms, a video game in the Total War series, released in May 2019.

See also

 Sanzan period: three polities of 14th-century Ryukyu Islands
 Records of the Three Kingdoms (disambiguation)
 Romance of the Three Kingdoms (disambiguation)
 Three crowns (disambiguation)
 Tri Nations (disambiguation) including "3 Nations"